Marie-Hélène Sajka (born 13 September 1997) is a French handball player who plays for Nykøbing Falster Håndboldklub and the France national team.

Achievements
French Championship:
Winner: 2016, 2017, 2018

References

1997 births
Living people
Sportspeople from Nancy, France
French female handball players